The Tongdao Pinghua is a variety of Guibei Pinghua (桂北平话) influenced by Kam (Dong). It is spoken by about 25,000 people in Tongdao Dong Autonomous County, Hunan, China (Shi 2015:137).

Although Tongdao Pinghua speakers are classified by the Chinese government as ethnic Han, the speakers consider themselves to be a distinct ethnic group, and neither Han nor Kam.

Names
Tongdao Pinghua speakers call their own language Bendihua 本地话 (the name Bendihua literally means 'native language'), although some speakers also refer to it as Jiangping 讲平.

Tongdao Pinghua speakers call themselves the  people (我们人) (Shi 2015:137).

Locations
Within Tongdao Dong Autonomous County, Hunan Province, Tongdao Pinghua is primarily spoken in Xiaxiang 下乡, Linkou 临口, and Jingwuzhou 菁芜州 townships. Tongdao Pinghua is also spoken to a lesser extent in the townships of Mujiao 木脚, Xikou 溪口, and Malong 马龙, as well as Chengbu County, Hunan and Longsheng County, Guangxi.

Dialects
Peng (2010:1) divides Tongdao Pinghua into 4 main dialects.

Xiaxiang 下乡话: spoken in the townships of Xiaxiang 下乡 (entire township), Linkou 临口 (in the villages of Guantuan 官团, Shanxi 山溪, and Shibi 石壁), and Mujiao 木脚 (in Xishang Village 溪上 and Gengtou Village 更头)
Jingwu 菁芜话: spoken in some villages in Jingwuzhou Township 菁芜洲镇. Shi (2015) documents the variety of Luantang 銮塘 in Jingwuzhou Township 菁芜洲镇.
Xingwu 杏五话: spoken by just under 3,000 people in Linkou Township 临口乡 (in Xinhua 杏花 and Wuyi 五一 villages, as well as other neighboring villages)
Taizhong 太中话: spoken in the townships of Taipingyan 太平岩, Zhongtuan 中团, and Mujiao 木脚 (in Mujiao Village 木脚村)

Shi (2015) recognizes the 4 Tongdao Pinghua dialects of:
Luantang 銮塘
Linkou 临口
Taipingyan 太平岩
Dengkou 邓口

References

Peng Jianguo [彭建国]. 2010. 湖南通道侗族“本地话”的语音系统及其归属. Journal of Yunmeng 云梦学刊, Vol. 31, No. 4.
Peng Jianguo [彭建国]. 2003.  Research on Bendihua of Tongdao County, Hunan (湖南通道“本地话”调查). M.A. dissertation. Changsha: Hunan Normal University [湖南师范大学].
Shi Lin [石林]. 2015. Three language varieties of the Hunan-Guizhou-Guangxi border region [湘黔桂边区的三个族群方言岛]. Beijing: China Social Sciences Academy Press [中国社会科学出版社]. 

Varieties of Chinese